Giampietro is a surname. Notable people with the surname include:
Michael Giampietro (Born 1990), Australian Electronics and Communication Technician
Domenico Pellegrini Giampietro (1899–1970), Italian academic, economist, lawyer, politician and journalist
Frank Giampietro, American poet
Gordon P. Giampietro (born 1965), American lawyer
Sydney Giampietro (born 1999), Italian sho putter
 JOSEPH GIAMPIETRO (born 1955 ) Grand Master of the Martial Arts (Taekwondo)

See also
Giampietro (given name)